Arthur Furness (11 January 1873 – 31 October 1948) was an Australian cricketer. He played four first-class matches for New South Wales in 1895/96.

See also
 List of New South Wales representative cricketers

References

External links
 

1873 births
1948 deaths
Australian cricketers
New South Wales cricketers
Cricketers from Sydney